Suri Hati Mr. Pilot is a drama that aired in MegaDrama slot on Monday to Thursday at 10 pm Astro Ria Ria 104 and HD 123. This drama is an adaptation of the novel Suri Hati Mr. Pilot written by Dyla Dyna and published by Kaki Novel Enterprise. The drama's director is Michael Ang and Hadith Omar. This drama was published by Cube Film Co. Ltd. The main lead of this drama is Neelofa and Fattah Amin. The drama also starring Eleena Sui, Alvin Chong, Mas Khan, Aleeza Shadan, Nina Juren, and many others. The first episode of this drama managed to get 5.5 million views and the highest record in the history of drama performance in Malaysia. Suri Hati Mr. Pilot be connected in Telemovie Suri Hati Mr. Pilot Raya.

Synopsis
Tells the story of a meeting between Ejaz (Fattah Amin), Mr. Pilot and Warda (Neelofa) to reopen the worksheet story two years ago. The events that led to Warda family thrown on his own stupidity that is so obsessed with Muslim love. The shakes were present for Ejaz frantic life and self Warda. Ejaz pushed jealous with the presence of Daniel Sein who also keeps a special feeling in Warda. Finally he refused to marry Warda. Marriage built beginning to raise seed of love in their hearts. However tika happy to be on top, again demanding Muslim love. Inara start making plans. Ejaz start hunted suspicious. Fractured relationships among sides finally collapsed when a misfortune befell Ejaz and snatching away all the dreams and his love for Warda and aviation.

Cast

Main cast
Fattah Amin as Ejaz Fakhri
Neelofa as Warda
Ben Amir as Muslim
Eleena Sui as Inara
Azar Azmi as Humaira
Fahad Iman as Rafeeq
Mas Khan as Daniel Sein
Alvin Chong as Johan
Aleza Shadan as Datin Afifah
Datin Nina Juren as Puan Sri Nabiha
Adriana Adnan as Jannah
Neera Azizi as Emira
Rahhim Omar as Dato' Dr. Hasbullah
Azhar Amir as Tan Sri Khalid Al-Fattah
Eina Azman as Dr. Khairina
Duerra Mitilda as Waffiya Elena binti Ejaz Fakhri
Nizen Ayob as Faris
Mak Wan
Normah Damanhuri as Nenek Ejaz Fakhri
CK Faizal

Special appearance
Alif Satar as Ahnaf Wafiy
Siti Nordiana

2010s Malaysian television series